Haigam is a census village in Baramulla district, Jammu & Kashmir, India. As per the 2011 Census of India, Haigam has a total population of 6,212 people including 3,148 males and 3,064 with a literacy rate of 60.61%.

A 4,800 years old pot found in apple orchard at Haigam is named after American actress Kim Kardashian.

Haigam is also one of the militancy-affected areas in Jammu & Kashmir district.

Tourism 
The Haigam lake is interest of tourist visit.

References 

Villages in Baramulla district